Miloslav Hamer (Hamr in some sources) (22 June 1913 - 4 February 2002) was a Czechoslovak international table tennis player who was world champion in mixed doubles and team table tennis.

Table tennis career
He won eleven medals in the World Table Tennis Championships from 1933 to 1939.  In March 1936, he teamed with Gertrude Kleinová to win the gold medal in the Mixed Doubles 10th World Table Tennis Championships in Prague, in a competition that saw them defeat Americans Buddy Blattner and Jay Purves in the preliminaries as they won 21–19 in the fifth game. He also won the team championship in 1939 in Cairo.

See also
World Table Tennis Championships
 List of table tennis players
 List of World Table Tennis Championships medalists

References

External links
ITTF bio

1913 births
2002 deaths
Czech male table tennis players
Czechoslovak table tennis players
World Table Tennis Championships medalists